Cootie Williams and His Orchestra 1941–1944 is a compilation album of recordings from 1941, 1942 and 1944 that jazz trumpeter Cootie Williams made with his orchestra and in smaller groups, released on Classics in 1995. The 1942–44 musicians' strike explains the lack of sessions from 1943.

History 
Two firsts about this record concerning Thelonious Monk: one, the April 1, 1942 Chicago session is the first recording of "Epistrophy" (called "Fly Right" here) which Monk wrote with Kenny Clarke earlier the same year; and two, the August 22, 1944 session is the first recording of Monk's "'Round Midnight". Cootie Williams is often given a co-credit on both songs.

The January 4, 1944 session marks the recording debut of Bud Powell, aged 20 (Williams was his legal guardian at the time in order to take Powell on the road with his orchestra), while the January 6, 1944 session features two of Pearl Bailey's earliest recordings.

Track listing 
All songs were written by Cootie Williams, except where noted.
 "West End Blues" (King Oliver, Clarence Williams) – 3:08
 "Ain't Misbehavin'" (Fats Waller, Henry Brooks, Andy Razaf) – 2:38
 "Blues in My Condition" – 2:52
 "G-Men" – 2:41
 "Sleepy Valley" (unknown) – 2:54
 "Marcheta" (Victor Schertzinger) – 3:02
 "When My Baby Left Me" (Eddie Vinson, Williams) – 2:38
 "Fly Right" (aka "Epistrophy") (Thelonious Monk, Kenny Clarke) – 2:30
 "You Talk a Little Trash" – 2:59
 "Floogie Boo" (Vinson, Williams) – 2:36
 "I Don't Know" (Vinson, Williams) – 3:14
 "Do Some War Work, Baby" (aka "Gotta Do Some War Work") – 3:06
 "My Old Flame" (Arthur Johnston, Sam Coslow) – 3:16
 "Sweet Lorraine" (Cliff Burwell, Mitchell Parish) – 3:06
 "Echoes of Harlem" (Duke Ellington) – 3:05
 "Honeysuckle Rose" (Waller, Razaf) – 3:06
 "Now I Know" (Harold Arlen, Ted Koehler) – 3:02
 "Tess's Torch Song" (aka "I Had a Man") (Arlen, Koehler) – 2:33
 "Cherry Red Blues" (Bob Haggart) – 3:08
 "Things Ain't What They Used to Be" (Mercer Ellington, Ted Persons) – 3:16
 "Is You Is or Is You Ain't My Baby?" (Louis Jordan, Billy Austin) – 2:46
 "Somebody's Gotta Go" (Haggart) – 3:19
 "'Round Midnight" (Monk) – 3:18
 "Blue Garden Blues" (aka "Royal Garden Blues") (Spencer Williams, Clarence Williams) – 3:13

Personnel

Performance 
May 7, 1941, New York. Tracks 1-4.
 Cootie Williams – trumpet
 Lou McGarity – trombone
 Les Robinson – alto sax
 Skippy Martin – baritone sax
 John Guarnieri – piano
 Artie Bernstein – bass
 Jo Jones – drums
April 1, 1942, Chicago. Tracks 5-8.
 Cootie Williams – trumpet
 Milton Fraser – trumpet
 Joe Guy – trumpet
 Louis Bacon – trumpet, vocals (track 6)
 Jonas Walker – trombone
 Robert Horton – trombone
 Sandy Williams – trombone
 Charlie Holmes – alto sax
 Eddie "Cleanhead" Vinson – alto sax, vocals (track 7)
 Bob Dorsey – tenor sax
 Greely Walton – tenor sax
 John Williams – baritone sax
 Kenny Kersey – piano
 Norman Keenan – bass
 George "Butch" Ballard – drums
January 4, 1944, New York. Tracks 9-12. January 6, 1944, New York. Tracks 13-16.
 Cootie Williams – trumpet, vocals (track 12)
 Eddie "Cleanhead" Vinson – alto sax
 Eddie "Jockjaw" Davis – tenor sax
 Bud Powell – piano
 Norman Keenan – bass
 Sylvester "Vess" Payne – drums
January 6, 1944, New York. Tracks 17-20.
 Pearl Bailey – vocals (tracks 17-18)
 Cootie Williams – trumpet
 Ermit V. Perry – trumpet
 George Treadwell – trumpet
 Harold "Money" Johnson – trumpet
 Ed Burke – trombone
 George Stevenson – trombone
 Robert Horton – trombone
 Eddie "Cleanhead" Vinson – alto sax, vocals (tracks 19-20)
 Charlie Holmes – alto sax
 Eddie "Jockjaw" Davis – tenor sax
 Lee Pope – tenor sax
 Eddie de Verteuil – baritone sax
 Bud Powell – piano
 Norman Keenan – bass
 Sylvester "Vess" Payne – drums
August 22, 1944, New York. Tracks 21-24.
 Cootie Williams – trumpet
 Ermit V. Perry – trumpet
 George Treadwell – trumpet
 Lammar Wright – trumpet
 Tommy Stevenson – trumpet
 Ed Burke – trombone
 Ed Glover – trombone
 Robert Horton – trombone
 Eddie "Cleanhead" Vinson – alto sax, vocals (tracks 21-22)
 Frank Powell – alto sax
 Sam "The Man" Taylor – tenor sax
 Lee Pope – tenor sax
 Eddie de Verteuil – baritone sax
 Bud Powell – piano
 Leroy Kirkland – guitar
 Carl Pruitt – bass
 Sylvester "Vess" Payne – drums

Production 
 Anatol Schenker – liner notes

Notes and references 

Cootie Williams albums
1995 compilation albums